Shigatse Peace Airport , Shigatse Heping Airport, or Shigatse Air Base, is a dual-use military and civilian airport serving Shigatse, the second largest city in Tibet Autonomous Region, China. It is located in Jangdam Township,  from Shigatse.

Construction of Shigatse Airport started in 1968 and was completed in 1973. It was solely for military use until 2010, when a 532 million yuan expansion was completed.  On 30 October 2010, the airport was opened as the fifth civilian airport in Tibet.

Facilities
The airport has a  runway with a  asphalt overrun at each end. It is the longest public runway in the world. It also features a  terminal building.

The runway is located at the west-end of its primary runway.

Gallery

Airlines and destinations

Map and location markers

See also
List of airports in China
List of the busiest airports in China
List of People's Liberation Army Air Force airbases

References

Airports in the Tibet Autonomous Region
Chinese Air Force bases
Airports established in 1973
1973 establishments in China
Airports established in 2010
2010 establishments in China
Shigatse